Cyperus cephalotes is a species of sedge that is native to tropical areas in Asia and Australia.

The species was first formally described by the botanist Martin Vahl in 1805.

See also 
 List of Cyperus species

References 

cephalotes
Taxa named by Martin Vahl
Plants described in 1805
Flora of Queensland
Flora of China
Flora of Bangladesh
Flora of Borneo
Flora of Indonesia
Flora of Myanmar
Flora of New Guinea
Flora of Sri Lanka
Flora of Thailand
Flora of Vietnam